Death Ring is a 1992 action film starring Mike Norris, Billy Drago, Chad McQueen, Elizabeth Sung, Don Swayze, Ron Thompson and directed by R.J. Kizer.

Plot
Ex-Green Beret Matt Collins is kidnapped along with his fiancée, Lauren Sadler, by the crazed hunter extraordinaire Danton Vachs. Every year, Vachs holds a contest where people can purchase the right to hunt down and kill human beings. This time, Collins is to be the hunted while Vachs uses Lauren as motivation for him to really fight for his life, thus providing the buyers with an exceptionally entertaining hunt. As the hunt begins, Collins is set free on an uncharted island where four killers are set out to find and kill him.

Cast
 Mike Norris as Matt Collins
 Billy Drago as Danton Vachs
 Chad McQueen as 'Skylord' Harris
 Don Swayze as John Blackwell
 Elizabeth Fong Sung as Ms. Ling
 Isabel Glasser as Lauren Sadler
 Branscombe Richmond as Mr. Cross
 Kelly Bennett as Merlin, At Talismania
 Víctor Quintero as 'Iceman'
 George Kee Cheung as Mr. Chen
 Henry Kingi as 'Apache'
 Donegan Smith as Mr. Temple
 Melanie Elam as Bambi, Female Guard #1
 Taryn Swallow as Thumper, Female Guard #2
 Dennis Lipscomb as Jessup
 Carl Ciarfalio as Pax, Bar Bully
 Joel Stoffer as Orin, Weasley Thug
 Ron Howard George as Crowley, Bigger Thug
 Vincent Lucchesi as Andy, Batting Cage
 Tammy Stones as Cindy Macklin
 Judy Peterson as 'Sparrow', Bar Waitress
 Francine Forbes as Joan Tomlin, Newscaster
 Ron Thompson as 'Needles', Tattooer
 Lana Shields as Lisa, Tattoo Parlor
 Leslie Jean De Beauvais as Diane, Tattoo Parlor

References

External links

1993 films
American action films
1990s action films
1990s English-language films
1990s American films